The Dallam County Courthouse, at Fifth and Denrock Sts. in Dalhart, Texas, is a historic courthouse that was built in 1923.  It was designed by J. Roy Smith in Classical Revival style.  It was listed on the National Register of Historic Places in 1992.

It replaced a 1903 building;  it was funded by a bond approved by voters in 1922.  It was designed by Smith and Townes.  It is made of brick with cast stone detailing, and serves the county still.

See also

National Register of Historic Places listings in Dallam County, Texas
Recorded Texas Historic Landmarks in Dallam County
List of county courthouses in Texas

References

Courthouses on the National Register of Historic Places in Texas
Neoclassical architecture in Texas
Government buildings completed in 1923
Buildings and structures in Dallam County, Texas
County courthouses in Texas
National Register of Historic Places in Dallam County, Texas